Jilly Wallace ( Curry) is a British former freestyle skier, who won 29 FIS World Cup medals, which was the most for any British skier or snowboarder until 2020. She competed at the 1992 and 1994 Winter Olympics. She was World Champion in Laser-Run in 2019 (Women's Team) and 2022 (individual + mixed team masters) at the UIPM World Championships.

Career
Curry competed in freestyle skiing from 1984 to 1994. During her career, she won 29 FIS World Cup medals, including three gold medals. Her medal tally was more than any other British skier or snowboarder in FIS World Cup events, until her record was broken by Jasmin Taylor in 2020. Curry came second at three consecutive 1989–90 FIS Freestyle Ski World Cup events, the last one of which was in Breckenridge, Colorado, US.

Curry came fourth in the aerial skiing demonstration event at the 1992 Winter Olympics in Albertville, France, and also competed at the 1994 Winter Olympics in Lillehammer, Norway. She came 21st out of 23 competitors, and did not qualify for the final.

In 2019, Curry competed nationally and internationally in laser run, a discipline of modern pentathlon. As part of the British Team she was 2019 World Champion (Ladies Team), and European Champion (Ladies Team and Mixed Team) in the masters category. She became the double World Champion in masters laser run in 2022 in the individual women's and mixed relay. She won the  European Laser Run Championships 2022 in masters individual women's and mixed relay.

Personal life
Curry is from London. Curry is married to Robin Wallace, who was her coach. Wallace competed for Great Britain in freestyle skiing at the 1988 Winter Olympics in Calgary, Canada. Their son Lloyd competed in the 2018 and 2022 Winter Olympics. Curry's father Peter competed at the 1948 Summer Olympics in the 3000 metres steeplechase.

References

External links
 
 
 

Living people
English female freestyle skiers
Olympic freestyle skiers of Great Britain
Freestyle skiers at the 1992 Winter Olympics
Freestyle skiers at the 1994 Winter Olympics
Sportspeople from London
Year of birth missing (living people)